San Luis Potosí, commonly called SLP or simply San Luis, is the capital and the most populous city of the Mexican state of San Luis Potosí. It is the municipal seat of the surrounding municipality of San Luis Potosí. It has an estimated population of 824,229 in the city proper and a population of approximately 1,221,526 in its metropolitan area, formed with the neighbour city of Soledad de Graciano Sánchez and other surrounding municipalities, which makes the metropolitan area of Greater San Luis Potosí the eleventh largest in Mexico.

It is part of the macroregion of Bajío.

The city is named after Louis IX of France (also known in Mexico as San Luis Rey de Francia, Saint Louis, King of France), who is the city's patron saint. Potosí was added in reference to the fabulously rich mines of Potosí, Bolivia, discovered some forty years before the city was founded, as the exploitation of silver and gold mines in Cerro de San Pedro, near San Luis, was the main reason for the founding of the city in 1592.

Now, the city is one of the main industrial centres in central Mexico with a prolific manufacturing industry. A number of foreign industries have chosen to invest in San Luis Potosí in the last decades thanks to its strategic location for trade, as the city is located halfway between Mexico City and the United States border, as well as in the middle of the triangle formed by the three largest cities in Mexico: Mexico City, Guadalajara, and Monterrey.

Besides its industry-based economy, recently the city has been promoted as a touristic destination in central Mexico by state and federal programs. San Luis Potosí's historic center displays a great mixture of different artistic styles in many buildings and is a major example of colonial architecture in Mexico. In 2010, the historic center was listed as a UNESCO World Heritage Site within Camino Real de Tierra Adentro.

History

Pre-colonial period
In pre-Hispanic times the territory now occupied by the state of San Luis Potosí included two cultural areas: Mesoamerica and Aridoamerica. While the southern and eastern regions of the state were occupied by Otomi and Huastec kingdoms, its northern and central-west regions, where the city of San Luis now is located, were inhabited by Chichimeca. Chichimeca is a generic term given to various nomadic ethnicities which inhabited the northern fringes of the Aztec Empire, which is now northern Mexico. As they were nomadic peoples, they did not build large cities nor have permanent settlements like most Mesoamerican civilizations. They are described by historians as very warlike peoples, living in continual wars among themselves. These tribes spoke different languages but their customs were similar.

After the arrival of Spanish conquistadores and their indigenous allies into the territory now formed by the Mexican nation, it still took them about a century to colonize the northern territories in Aridoamerica. When the settlers founded the first settlements in the region in late 16th century, they had to struggle against constant attacks from Guachichil tribes. Extremely belligerent, these tribes attacked traders who traveled to Zacatecas in newly created routes. Conquistadores and religious missionaries called the place where San Luis now is located "El Gran Tunal" (Grand Place of Tuna fruit). Finally, in 1589, peace between Chichimeca peoples and Spanish settlers was reached thanks to efforts made by Miguel Caldera and Brother Diego de la Magdalena, which marked the end of the Chichimeca War.

Colonial period
A Franciscan mission was established in the zone in 1583, nine years before the city's founding. In early 1592 the mines of Cerro de San Pedro were discovered. The lack of water in Cerro de San Pedro made impossible a new settlement in that specific area, as well as the proper exploitation of the minerals. A short distance away there was a valley where water was abundant. This originated the creation of a new township to facilitate the labors of mining extraction. The legal foundation of the town of San Luis Potosí was made in November 3, 1592, according to a charter commission raised by Viceroy Luís de Velasco and given to Miguel Caldera (considered the historic founder of the city) and Juan de Oñate.

Independence
For a time in 1863, during the French invasion of Mexico, San Luis Potosí served as the capital of the republican government, under President Benito Juárez.

The Plan of San Luis Potosí, issued November 20, 1910, was the opening shot of Mexico's revolution against the dictator Porfirio Díaz. The 1910 presidential election was stolen when Díaz had his opponent Francisco I. Madero arrested and imprisoned. Madero fled and issued the Plan of San Luis Potosí, declaring the election void and calling upon Mexicans to take up arms against the government.

Today, the downtown is one of plazas and colonial architecture. The "Plaza de Armas" is the site of a cathedral and governor's palace (1770). The nearby "Templo de Nuestra Señora del Carmen," with its colorful tiled domes and famous altars, is considered among Mexico's finest churches. In addition, San Luis is home to the bullring Plaza de Toros Fermin Rivera.

Outside the center, a modern industrial city has begun to grow.

The Universidad Autónoma de San Luis Potosí (UASLP) is in the city. Based on a Jesuit College founded in 1624, the Instituto Científico y Literario was raised to the category of a university in 1923, and is recognized as one of Latin America's best universities.

Today
With a population of approximately one million inhabitants, it is now the twelfth largest metropolitan area in Mexico. The city is a major commercial and industrial center. It lies in an economically advantageous area at the heart of the "triangle" formed by the three largest cities in Mexico: Mexico City, Guadalajara and Monterrey.

In recent years, the city has attracted the attention of European and American investors; its political, social, and economic stability has convinced large multinational companies to assume a presence there
and to buy land, on the outskirts of the city.

Recently, according to a survey conducted by the magazine The Investor, San Luis Potosí and its metropolitan area was the third-best place to live in Mexico.

Geography

Climate 
San Luis Potosí features a cold semi-arid climate (BSk) under the Köppen climate classification. Its high altitude means that the city experiences only a handful of hot days each year. While the climate exhibits noticeably cooler (January and February) and warmer periods (April and May) of the year, temperatures are relatively consistent throughout the course of the year. San Luis Potosí receives, on average,  of precipitation annually, mostly seen from May through October. Snowfall is a rare occurrence in the city downtown, even though it is not uncommon in the city outskirts and in the highest parts of the greater San Luis Potosí area to get reports of frost and some snow during the winter.

The last recorded snowfalls occurred in January 1967, December 13, 1997, December 2011, March 2016, and December 8, 2017.

Local cuisine
Potosinos (as residents of the city are referred to) are proud of their bright orange enchiladas potosinas, often served with refried beans and guacamole.

The nearby town of Santa María del Río provides the state with its sparkling mineral water, Agua de Lourdes. The water fills both store shelves and the cocktails of Potosinos, who claim the water can cure a hangover.

Important buildings

Besides having hundreds of classically designed buildings, the city is also home to some of the most modern and interesting buildings in Mexico.

In recent years the city has faced a boom in the construction of buildings and museums. Among the most prominent are the Laberinto Museum of Science and Arts, which was an investment of more than $200 million pesos, in 9000 m2 of land in the Tangamanga I Park. The project was designed by architect Ricardo Legorreta and promoted by the governor of San Luis Potosí, Marcelo de los Santos Fraga. It is a museum of aesthetic proportions similar to that of the Papalote Museum of Children in Mexico City, with the addition that the materials used in its construction, especially the quarry, make it a real Potosino manufacturing building. The floor of the museum occupies a total of 6.5 ha, which have gardens with species endemic to the region and a central source. Its interior is divided into a total of six rooms arranged in galleries. Their proportions will allow visitors to make an interactive tour that will switch themes of the art museum with samples of science and technology.

Currently, the two tallest buildings in the city are the EME Building and the Muniz Werger Building. The EME Building was built in 1988 and measures 64 m to the top floor, with the spiral 75 m, with the antenna 98 meters. It has 17 floors, with 10 levels of parking at the street for a capacity of 1500 cars, and it houses mixed offices. The Muniz Werger Building, which measures 58 m for the top floor, 65 m with the spiral, and 80 m with the antenna, has 15 storeys and two elevators. Its construction began in 1991 and finished in 1993, and it is considered the most modern building in the city.

There are currently two buildings under construction and five buildings in the project. Corporate Tangamanga, which measured 41 m, will have 14 floors; its construction began in 2005 and will end in 2008. This building houses offices and mixed Star Medical Tower, 40 m and will have 8 floors.

Commerce and transportation
Various supermarket chains operate in the city, such as, H-E-B, Commercial Mexicana, Costco, Walmex (Wal-mart, Sam's Club, Superama, Vips, Bodega Aurrera and Suburbia), Chedraui, and Home Depot.

The principal commercial centers of the city are Plaza Tangamanga, Plaza el Dorado, Plaza Sendero, Plaza Citadella and Plaza San Luis.

In the city, various banks also operate, such as, BBVA Bancomer, Banamex, HSBC, Banorte, Santander-Serfin, Actinver, Scotiabank-Inverlat, and BanRegio.

The city's transportation consists of a public system, based on urban buses that move throughout the metropolitan area.
Besides, the city contains one of the highest concentrations of taxis.

Ponciano Arriaga International Airport is the city's main airway point.

Higher education and scientific research
These places offer degrees at the bachelor level:
 El Colegio de San Luis
 Instituto Potosino de Investigación Científica y Tecnológica, A.C. (IPICYT)
 Instituto Tecnologico de San Luis Potosí (ITSLP)
 Instituto Tecnologico y de Estudios Superiores de Monterrey - Campus San Luis (ITESM)
 Polytechnic University of San Luis Potosí
 Universidad Autonoma de San Luis Potosí (UASLP)
 Universidad del Centro de Mexico (UCEM)
 Universidad Cuauhtemoc - Campus San Luis Potosí
 Universidad Interamericana del Norte - Campus San Luis
 Universidad Interamericana para el Desarrollo - Campus San Luis
 Universidad Marista - Campus San Luis Potosí
 Universidad Pedagogica Nacional - Campus San Luis Potosí
 Universidad Politécnica de San Luis Potosí (UPSLP)
 Universidad Potosina
 Universidad Tangamanga
 Universidad Tec Milenio
 Universidad Tecnológica de San Luis Potosí

IPICYT, UASLP and El Colegio de San Luis are also world class research institutions that offer doctoral degrees.

Government

Mayors and municipal presidents

Local news media
Newspapers include El Sol de San Luis, Pulso, El Heraldo de San Luis, La Prensa, San Luis Hoy, La Jornada San Luis, and Tribuna.

Twin towns – sister cities
San Luis Potosí has the following sister cities in Mexico and abroad:
 Spokane, Washington, United States
 Tulsa, Oklahoma, United States
 Pico Rivera, California, United States
 St. Louis, Missouri, United States
 Pharr, Texas, United States
 Almadén, Spain
 Santander, Cantabria, Spain
 Sant Joan de les Abadesses, Spain
 Potosí, Bolivia
 Guadalajara, Jalisco, Mexico
 Aguascalientes, Aguascalientes, Mexico
 Guadalupe, Mexico
 Zacatecas, Mexico
 Zapotlán el Grande, Jalisco, Mexico
 Idrija, Slovenia
 Ružomberok, Slovakia

Festivals

Procession of Silence 

This is an annual event commemorating the passion and death of Christ. It occurs on the night of Good Friday, starting at the Templo del Carmen, from where it originates and proceeding through the streets of the historic center of the city of San Luis Potosí. Drums and bugles are played as a part of the procession, but participants and spectators do not speak, meriting its name. It is one of the most important celebrations of Easter in Mexico and was declared part of the cultural heritage of the state of San Luis Potosí in 2013.

Notes

References

Sources
Link to tables of population data from Census of 2005 INEGI: Instituto Nacional de Estadística, Geografía e Informática
San Luis Potosí Enciclopedia de los Municipios de México

External links

City of San Luis Potosí - Spanish
Plan of San Luis Potosí - English
Churches of San Luis Potosí - Spanish

 
Cities in Mexico

Capitals of states of Mexico
Populated places established in 1592
1592 establishments in New Spain
1590s establishments in Mexico
1592 in New Spain